The PFL 11 mixed martial arts event for the 2018 season of the Professional Fighters League, the PFL 2018 Championship, was held on December 31, 2018, at the Hulu Theater at Madison Square Garden in New York City, New York.

Background
The event was the eleventh and final event of the 2018 season. Each champion in the six weight classes was crowned and won a championship prize of $1 million each.

Results

2018 PFL Heavyweight playoffs

2018 PFL Light Heavyweight playoffs

2018 PFL Middleweight playoffs

2018 PFL Welterweight playoffs

2018 PFL Lightweight playoffs

2018 PFL Featherweight playoffs

See also
List of PFL events
List of current PFL fighters

References

Professional Fighters League
2018 in mixed martial arts
Mixed martial arts in New York (state)
Sports in Manhattan
2018 in sports in New York (state)
December 2018 sports events in the United States
Sporting events in New York City
Mixed martial arts events